The Birsa Munda Express is an Express train belonging to South Eastern Railway zone that runs between  and  in India. It is currently being operated with 22821/22822 train numbers on bi-weekly basis.

Service
The 22821/Birsa Munda Express has an average speed of 55 km/hr and covers 185 km in 3h 20m. The 22822/Birsa Munda Express has an average speed of 57 km/hr and covers 185 km in 3h 15m.

Route and halts 
The important halts of the train are:

Coach composition
The train has standard ICF rakes with a max speed of 110 kmph. The train consists of 9 coaches:

 7 General Unreserved
 2 Seating cum Luggage Rake

Traction
Both trains are hauled by a Tatanagar Loco Shed-based WAM-4 electric locomotive from Jhargram to Purulia and vice versa.

Rake sharing
The train shares its rake with 22875/22876 Kharagpur–Purulia Intercity Express and 12865/12866 Lalmati Express.

See also 
 Jhargram railway station
 Purulia Junction railway station
 Kharagpur–Purulia Intercity Express
 Lalmati Express

Notes

References

External links 
 22821/Birsa Munda Express India Rail Info
 22822/Birsa Munda Express India Rail Info

Express trains in India
Rail transport in West Bengal
Rail transport in Jharkhand
Named passenger trains of India